In botany, a bract is a modified or specialized leaf, especially one associated with a reproductive structure such as a flower, inflorescence axis or cone scale. Bracts are usually different from foliage leaves. They may be smaller, larger, or of a different color, shape, or texture. Typically, they also look different from the parts of the flower, such as the petals or sepals. A plant having bracts is referred to as bracteate or bracteolate, while one that lacks them is referred to as ebracteate and ebracteolate, without bracts.

Variants

Some bracts are brightly-coloured and serve the function of attracting pollinators, either together with the perianth or instead of it. Examples of this type of bract include those of Euphorbia pulcherrima (poinsettia) and Bougainvillea: both of these have large colourful bracts surrounding much smaller, less colourful flowers.

In grasses, each floret (flower) is enclosed in a pair of papery bracts, called the lemma (lower bract) and palea (upper bract), while each spikelet (group of florets) has a further pair of bracts at its base called glumes.  These bracts form the chaff removed from cereal grain during threshing and winnowing.

Bats may detect acoustic signals from dish-shaped bracts such as those of Marcgravia evenia.

A prophyll is a leaf-like structure, such as a bracteole, subtending (extending under) a single flower or pedicel. The term can also mean the lower bract on a peduncle.

The frequently showy pair of bracts of Euphorbia species in subgenus Lacanthis are the cyathophylls.

Bracts subtend the cone scales in the seed cones of many conifers, and in some cases, such as Pseudotsuga, they extend beyond the cone scales.

Bracteole
A small bract is called a bracteole or bractlet. Technically this is any bract that arises on a pedicel instead of subtending it.

Involucral bracts 

Bracts that appear in a whorl subtending an inflorescence are collectively called an involucre. An involucre is a common feature beneath the inflorescences of many Apiaceae, Asteraceae, Dipsacaceae and Polygonaceae. Each flower in an inflorescence may have its own whorl of bracts, in this case called an involucel. In this case they may be called chaff, paleas, or receptacular bracts and are usually minute scales or bristles.  Many asteraceous plants have bracts at the base of each inflorescence.

The term involucre is also used for a highly conspicuous bract or bract pair at the base of an inflorescence. In the family Betulaceae, notably in the genera Carpinus and Corylus, the involucre is a leafy structure that protects the developing nuts. Beggar-tick (Bidens comosa) has narrow involucral bracts surrounding each inflorescence, each of which also has a single bract below it. There is then a pair of leafy bracts on the main stem and below those a pair of leaves.

Epicalyx

 
An epicalyx, which forms an additional whorl around the calyx of a single flower, is a modification of bracteoles In other words, the epicalyx is a group of bracts resembling a calyx or bracteoles forming a whorl outer to the calyx. It is a calyx-like extra whorl of floral appendages.  Each individual segment of the epicalyx is called an episepal because they resemble the sepals in them. They are present in the hibiscus family, Malvaceae. Fragaria (strawberries) may or may not have an epicalyx.

Spathe

A spathe is a large bract or pair of bracts forming a sheath to enclose the flower cluster of such plants as palms, arums, irises, crocuses, and dayflowers (Commelina). Zephyranthes tubispatha in the Amaryllidaceae derives its specific name from its tubular spathe. In many arums (family Araceae), the spathe is petal-like, attracting pollinators to the flowers arranged on a type of spike called a spadix.

References 

Plant morphology
Leaves